Afroaves is a clade of birds, consisting of the kingfishers and kin (Coraciiformes), woodpeckers and kin (Piciformes), hornbills and kin (Bucerotiformes), trogons (Trogoniformes), cuckoo roller (Leptosomiformes), mousebirds (Coliiformes), owls (Strigiformes), raptors (Accipitriformes) and New World vultures (Cathartiformes). The most basal clades are predatory, suggesting the last common ancestor of Afroaves was also a predatory bird.

The following cladogram of Afroaves relationships is based on Jarvis et al (2014), with some clade names after  Yury, T. et al. (2013) and Kimball et al. (2013).

Afroaves has not always been recovered as a monophyletic clade in subsequent studies. For instance, Prum et al. (2015) recovered the accipitrimorphs as the sister group to a clade (Eutelluraves) comprising the remaining afroavian orders and Australaves, while an analysis by Houde et al. (2019) recovered a clade of accipitrimorphs and owls as sister to the remaining landbirds.

References

Neognathae
Extant Danian first appearances